The Sarasota County Courthouse is a historic courthouse building located in Sarasota, Florida. Designed by architect Dwight James Baum in the Mediterranean Revival style, it was built in 1926-1927 by Stevenson and Cameron, Inc. of New York.

History 
The County Commission had plans to construct a courthouse since late 1924. Charles and Edith Ringling conveyed land to the building. In March 1925, the County Commission hired Dwight James Baum as architect for the courthouse. In September 1925, they awarded the construction contract to Stevenson and Cameron, Inc. of New York.

On March 22, 1984, it was added to the U.S. National Register of Historic Places.

Gallery

References

Further reading
 Florida's Historic Courthouses by Hampton Dunn

County courthouses in Florida
National Register of Historic Places in Sarasota County, Florida
Buildings and structures in Sarasota, Florida
Courthouses on the National Register of Historic Places in Florida